CSU Danubius Galați was a professional women's handball club in Galaţi, Romania.

Kits

Honours

Domestic competitions
Liga Națională (National League of Romania) 
 Third place: 2007–08

Cupa României (National Cup of Romania) 
 ''Finalist: 2010–11

External links
 
 

Liga Națională (women's handball) clubs
Romanian handball clubs
Sport in Galați
Handball clubs established in 2001
Handball clubs disestablished in 2018
2001 establishments in Romania
2018 disestablishments in Romania